Zana Berisha (born 1995) is a Kosovan model and beauty pageant titleholder who won Miss Kosovo 2018 on June 29, 2018. She represented Kosovo at Miss Universe 2018 pageant.

Personal life
Zana lives in Ferizaj, Kosovo. She was coming from Suhareka and graduating in Economics major. She is working as a model, also under the focus of the photographer Fadil Berisha.

Miss Kosova 2018 
Berisha joined Miss Kosova 2018, where she was crowned as Miss Universe Kosovo 2018 pageant. She succeeded outgoing Miss Universe Kosovo 2016 Camila Barraza.

Miss Universe 2018 
Berisha represented Kosovo at Miss Universe 2018 pageant in Bangkok, Thailand. But she was unplaced.

References

External links
www.revistavip.club
missuniverse.com

Living people
1995 births
Miss Universe 2018 contestants
Kosovo Albanians
Kosovan beauty pageant winners
Kosovan female models
People from Ferizaj